The North Macedonia men's national basketball team represents North Macedonia in international basketball and is controlled by the Basketball Federation of North Macedonia. They joined FIBA in 1993, after they gained independence from Yugoslavia. That same year the national team played their first official match against Estonia. Prior to 1993, Macedonian players took part on the Yugoslavia national team.

Macedonia debuted in their first international tournament at the EuroBasket in 1999. They have appeared five times at the event overall, with their top performance coming in 2011.

History

Before 1991, Macedonia was a Federal Republic of Yugoslavia, with players from Macedonia being part of the Yugoslavia national team. First match was in 1945 when Macedonia finished 4th. The first match was in 1945 against Croatia finishing 27-29. The team had mostly played  matches against teams from other republics of federation and was represented by Macedonian players under the traditional red, color.

EuroBasket 1999

After qualifying for EuroBasket 1999, the national team was placed in Group A, along with FR Yugoslavia, France and Israel. The first game Macedonia came out firing showing solid competitive play against the French Team, however, eventually lost by a narrow margin of 67–71. Next up, was Group A favorites FR Yugoslavia, showing superior play with their post up offense, Macedonia lost 68–83. With the final game of the group Macedonia played a fairly even match, however, luck was not on their side, losing 82–84. Even though Macedonia lost all 3 of their matches to be eliminated, the team showed heart and talent with their impressive play against France and Israel. Due to their small margin of the losses Macedonia ended the tournament ranked as 13th overall.

EuroBasket 2009
EuroBasket 2009 was the first EuroBasket tournament that Macedonia qualified for in a decade. Macedonia was placed in Group A, along with Greece, Croatia and Israel. Macedonia began the tournament with a brutal 54–86 loss to rivals Greece, but rebounded with an 82–79 victory over Israel. Despite dropping their last match against Croatia, the Israel result was enough to secure second round qualification. In the second round, Macedonia was placed in Group E alongside France, Germany and Russia. Macedonia lost to France in the second round opener, but famously defeated Germany in the next game. Against Russia, Macedonia was narrowly defeated by a score of 69–71. This performance was not enough to secure a berth in to the knockout round. Nevertheless, Macedonia considers this as a historic success for the national team, since it was only the country's second appearance at the EuroBasket and the team advanced past the first round. In the final tournament rankings, Macedonia ranked 9th place with a record of 2–4.

EuroBasket 2011

Through the qualifying round, Macedonia qualified for EuroBasket 2011 and was in Group C along with Bosnia and Herzegovina, Croatia, Greece, Montenegro, and Finland in the preliminary phase. The national team lost their first match to Montenegro 65–70 in overtime but won the remaining four against Croatia 78–76, Greece 72–58, Finland 72–70, and Bosnia and Herzegovina 75–63. Macedonia finished first in the group and advanced to the second round.

In the second round, Macedonia was in Group F with Russia, Slovenia, Greece, Georgia, and Finland. Having beaten Greece and Finland in the preliminary round, Macedonia went in to the second round with a 2–0 record. After beating Georgia 65–63, Macedonia qualified for the knockout round. The team then beat Slovenia 68–59, but lost to Russia by 2 points 63–61 after Sergey Monya made a buzzer-beating shot to win the final game of the second round. Macedonia, therefore, finished second in Group F.

For the first time in the national team's history, it reached the knockout stage where it defeated host country Lithuania 67–65 by 2 points in the quarter-finals. Macedonia then lost to the eventual champion Spain 92–80 in the semi-finals. They then lost again in the third place game to Russia 68–72 and finished in fourth place.

2012 Olympic Qualifying Tournament

By finishing in 4th place at EuroBasket 2011, Macedonia qualified for the 2012 FIBA Olympic Qualifying Tournament. They were drawn into Group D along with Angola and New Zealand. In the first game against Angola, Macedonia came out non-aggressive in the 1st half falling to a 13 pt deficit 40–53 at halftime. During most of the match, the top Macedonian players showed fatigue due to the grueling playoff matches they had played for their club teams. In addition, Macedonia came out with a strong 4th quarter, eventually losing by a margin of 4 points, with the final score being 84–88 Angola. Top scorers for Macedonia against Angola were Pero Antic with 17, and Bo McCalebb with 21. On the next match day, which was the day after with less than 24 hours of rest, Macedonia came out a lot stronger in the 1st quarter with a strong lead that carried over the entire game. Eventually, New Zealand could not recover, and fell to Macedonia with a final score of 84–62. Leading scorers for the game were Todor Gecevski with 16, Antic with 17, and McCalebb with 23.

The Macedonian players got much needed rest before the quarterfinals, which would begin two days later on 6 July 2012. The team, following the 68–64 victory by New Zealand over Angola, won Group D and its opponent in the quarterfinals was to be the Group C runner-up, Dominican Republic. Macedonia lost the game 86–76, though the team had a 13-point lead at halftime. The lost eliminated the national team from qualifying for the 2012 Olympic Games.

EuroBasket 2013

By participating at the 2012 FIBA World Olympic Qualifying Tournament, Macedonia qualified for EuroBasket 2013 in Slovenia. In a disappointing campaign, Macedonia did not manage to repeat the success from the previous Eurobasket, having one victory in five matches in their preliminary Group B against Serbia 89–75, which was good enough only for the last place in the group stage and 21st overall. The first game of the Eurobasket against Montenegro was particularly demoralizing, as the Montenegrins won 81–80 in controversial fashion, after the referees didn't call interference on the basket during Gjorgji Čekovski's last second game winning attempt, despite the fact that one of the Montenegrin players got his hand trapped in the net. Macedonia's best performers were once again McCalebb and Antić, with 17.6 and 13.8 points per game, respectively. After the tournament, several of the Macedonian veteran players, led by captain Pero Antić, announced their retirement from the national team.

EuroBasket 2015
At the EuroBasket 2015 there were not high expectations for Macedonia, due to their poor performance at their last EuroBasket appearance in 2013. In their first match against Greece they were thoroughly manhandled throughout as they were defeated 65-85. Looking for their first victory heading in to their second match of the tournament they went up against the Netherlands. The outcome was different this time, as the national team played with more energy and heart and pulled out an 78-71 win. Unfortunately, that would wind up being the only win for Macedonia, as they finished with an 1-4 record and a lousy 19th place at the event.

Recent years
Since 12 February 2019, the national team participate as North Macedonia. The national team took part in the 2019 FIBA World Cup Pre-Qualifiers, but were eliminated after posting an (1-3) record in their group. The team will now go through EuroBasket 2022 qualifiers for the chance to qualify to the next EuroBasket.

Competitive record

FIBA World Cup
  1950(10),1954(11),1963(2),1967(2),1970(1)1974(2),1978(1),1982(3),1986(3),1990(1)

Olympic Games
  1960(6),1964(7),1968(2)1972(5),1976(2),1980(1),1984(3),1988(2)

EuroBasket
  1947(13),1953(6),1955(8),1957(6),1959(9),1961(2)1963(3),1965(2),1967(9),1969(2),1971(2),1973(1),1975(1),1977(1)1979(3),1981(2),1983(7),1985(7),1987(3),1989(1),1991(1)

Minor Tournaments
 Yugoslav Basketball tournament 
 4th place:1945

Team image

Home ground
 
The BTSC – Boris Trajkovski Sports Center ,  Skopje is a multi-functional indoor sports arena. It is located in the Karpoš Municipality of Skopje, Macedonia. It is named after the former president, Boris Trajkovski. Its capacity is 10,000 .There is an Olympic size Swimming Pool and 5 Star Hotel Alexander Palace within the complex. Additional Water Land Fun Park and Ice Skating Rink next to it.

The arena is a home-ground of the  Macedonian basketball team (men and women). The venue also contains four restaurants and a sports bar.

Colors
National kit colors are colors of the flag which are also Spread on the Presidential Shield. Noble Red blood and Golden Yellow Sun Devine "ILI".

Team

Current roster
Squad for the games vs Slovakia and Norway on February 2023.

|}
| valign="top" |
 Head Coach
 Aleksandar Jončevski
 Assistant Coaches
 Nikola Vasilev
 Nikola Velev

Legend
Club – describes lastteam before the competition
Age – describes ageon 12 July 2022
|}
Following list is of active players who have been called up by the national team in the last year

|}
|}

Depth chart

Notable players
 Petar Naumoski – (1995–2002)
 Vrbica Stefanov – (1995–2009)
 Pero Blaževski – (1995–2009)
 Todor Gecevski – (1996–2013)
 Pero Antić – (2002–2013)
 Bo McCalebb – (2010–2013)
 Vlado Ilievski – (1998–2015)
 Predrag Samardžiski – (2005–2015)
 Gjorgji Čekovski – (1999–2017)
 Damjan Stojanovski – (2009–2021)

Coaching history

Past rosters
1999 EuroBasket: finished 13th among 16 teams

4 Vrbica Stefanov, 5 Vlado Ilievski, 6 Gjorgji Čekovski, 7 Mirza Kurtović, 8 Marjan Srbinovski, 9 Igor Mihajlovski, 10 Petar Naumoski, 11 Todor Gečevski, 12 Dejan Jovanovski, 13 Srdjan Stanković, 14 Pero Blaževski, 15 Dušan Bocevski (Coach: Zare Markovski)

2009 EuroBasket: finished 9th among 16 teams

4 Vrbica Stefanov, 5 Dimitar Mirakovski, 6 Darko Sokolov, 7 Riste Stefanov, 8 Vojdan Stojanovski, 9 Pero Blaževski, 10 Dime Tasovski, 11 Todor Gečevski, 12 Pero Antić, 13 Damjan Stojanovski, 14 Jeremiah Massey, 15 Predrag Samardžiski (Coach: Jovica Arsić)

2011 EuroBasket: finished 4th among 24 teams

4 Dimitar Mirakovski, 5 Vlado Ilievski, 6 Darko Sokolov, 7 Bo McCalebb, 8 Vojdan Stojanovski, 9 Damjan Stojanovski, 10 Marko Simonovski, 11 Todor Gečevski, 12 Pero Antic, 13 Ivica Dimcevski, 14 Gjorgji Čekovski, 15 Predrag Samardžiski (Coach: Marin Dokuzovski)

2012 Olympic Qualifying Tournament

4 Aleksandar Kostoski, 5 Vlado Ilievski. 6 Darko Sokolov, 7 Bo McCalebb, 8 Vojdan Stojanovski, 9 Damjan Stojanovski, 10 Marko Simonovski, 11 Todor Gečevski, 12 Pero Antić, 13 Kiril Nikolovski, 14 Gjorgji Čekovski, 15 Predrag Samardžiski (Coach: Marjan Lazovski)

2013 EuroBasket: finished 21st among 24 teams

4 Aleksandar Kostoski, 5 Vlado Ilievski. 6 Darko Sokolov, 7 Bo McCalebb, 8 Vojdan Stojanovski, 9 Damjan Stojanovski, 10 Vladimir Brčkov, 11 Todor Gečevski, 12 Pero Antić, 13 Stojan Gjuroski, 14 Gjorgji Čekovski, 15 Predrag Samardžiski (Coach: Aleš Pipan)

2015 EuroBasket: finished 19th among 24 teams

4 Vladimir Brčkov, 5 Vlado Ilievski. 6 Darko Sokolov, 7 Aleksandar Kostoski, 8 Vojdan Stojanovski, 9 Damjan Stojanovski, 10 Marko Simonovski, 11 Ljubomir Mladenovski, 12 Bojan Trajkovski, 13 Stojan Gjuroski, 14 Richard Hendrix, 15 Predrag Samardžiski (Coach: Marjan Srbinovski)

Recent results and upcoming fixtures

2021

2022

2023

Statistics

Most games played

All time points scored

* Active NT players are listed in bold
* Official FIBA games excluding Friendly games

Leader in points per game
300px|thunb|right

 Only played 2005 season in Division B (won promotion)

See also

North Macedonia women's national basketball team
North Macedonia men's national under-20 basketball team
North Macedonia men's national under-18 basketball team
North Macedonia men's national under-16 basketball team

Notes

References

External links

Official website 
North Macedonia FIBA profile
North Macedonia National Team – Men at Eurobasket.com
North Macedonia Basketball Records at FIBA Archive

Basketball
Men's national basketball teams